Kolkata Thunderbolts is a men's volleyball team from Kolkata, West Bengal playing in the Prime Volleyball League  in India. The team was founded in 2021 and owned by Kolkata Sports Ventures. They are the current defending champions, having won the 2022 PVL season by defeating Ahmedabad Defenders 3-0 in the final.

Honors
 Prime Volleyball League
 Winners (1): 2022

Team

Current team

Administration and support staff

References 

Sports clubs in India
Volleyball in India
Men's volleyball teams
Sports clubs in Kolkata